Euphlyctinides aeneola is a species of moth of the family Limacodidae. It is found in northern and western Thailand at altitudes of 400 to 1,400 meters.

The wingspan is 20–22 mm. The head, thorax and abdomen are brown. Both the forewings and hindwings are greyish brown, although the forewing has a darker costal area and a discal cell with dark-brown scales. The dark-brown postmedial fascia of the forewing consists of dispersal streak-like spots on the veins. Adults are on wing from mid-June to August and in October.

Etymology
The species name is derived from Latin aeneolus (meaning "produced from bronze") and refers to the colouration of the species.

References

External links 
 The Barcode of Life Data Systems (BOLD)

Limacodidae
Moths of Asia
Moths described in 2009